The 2019 Enugu State gubernatorial election was held on 9 March 2019.  Ifeanyi Ugwuanyi who won his party (PDP) primaries unopposed, got re-elected for office, Choosing Hon Mrs Cecilia Ezeilo as his deputy.

His rival and major opposition party the All Progressives Congress had series of court orders and counter count orders disrupting its election performance after the emergence of Ayogu Eze as its candidate,  Aggrieved members formed a faction of the party which led to the party having multiple candidates in the election.

Ifeanyi Ugwuanyi  the candidate of the Peoples Democratic Party (PDP) won in all the 17 local government areas and polled 449,935 votes to defeat his closest rival and candidate of the All Progressives Congress (APC), Ayogu Eze, who scored 10,423 votes.

Electoral system
The Governor of Enugu State is elected using the plurality voting system.

Primary elections

PDP primaries 
Ifeanyi Ugwuanyi emerged as his party flagbearer unopposed after all aspirants stepped down and he was voted for overwhelmingly by the 2,895 delegates who participated in the exercise.

Candidates 
 Ifeanyi Ugwuanyi Party Nominee and Incumbent Governor.
 Mrs. Cecilia Ezeilo Running mate

APC primaries 
The Apc primaries was marred by parallel elections one by the NWC faction of the Federal Government and the other one by loyalists of the state working committee.

Candidates 
 Ayogu Eze Eventual Party Flag bearer.
 Prince Gilbert Chukwunta Chikwado Running mate.
 George Tagbo Ogara Factional Gubernatorial Candidate.
 Benjamin Eche
 Augustine Akubue
 Ifeanyi Nwoga

Results 
42 candidates took part in this contest with Ifeanyi Ugwuanyi  the candidate of the Peoples Democratic Party (PDP) winning the 17 local government areas and polling 449,935 votes to defeat his closest rival and candidate of the All Progressives Congress (APC), Ayogu Eze, who scored 10,423 votes.

By Local Government area 
The exercise was carried out in 17 LGAs, with the Peoples Democratic Party having a clean sweep.

References

Enugu
Gubernatorial election 2019
Enugu State gubernatorial election
2019 Enugu State elections